Rafał Ratajczyk (born 5 April 1983, in Żyrardów) is a Polish former professional racing cyclist.

Doping
In December 2009, he was banned by the Polish Cycling Association for half a year for doping. He tested positive for ephedrine.

Career highlights

 2002: 3rd in European Championship, Track, Scratch, U23, Buttgen (GER)
 2004: 1st in European Championship, Track, Points race, U23, Valencia
 2004: 2nd in European Championship, Track, Scratch, U23, Valencia
 2005: 1st in National Championship, Road, ITT, U23, Poland, Sobótka (POL)
 2006: 1st in Manchester, Scratch (GBR)
 2006: 1st in Sydney, Scratch (AUS)
 2006: 2nd in World Championship, Track, Points race, Elite, Bordeaux
 2006: 2nd in European Championship, Track, Omnium, Elite, Ballerup (DEN)
 2007: 1st in Manchester, Scratch (GBR)
 2007: 3rd in World Championship, Track, Scratch, Elite, Palma de Mallorca (SPA)
 2007: 2nd in Aigle, Points race (SUI)
 2007: 2nd in European Championship, Track, Omnium, Elite, Alkmaar
 2007: 3rd in UIV Cup Dortmund, U23 (GER)
 2008: 2nd in Los Angeles, Points race (USA)
 2011: 1st in European Track Championships, Points race, Elite, Apeldoorn (NL)

References

External links
 

1983 births
Living people
People from Żyrardów
Polish male cyclists
Polish track cyclists
Cyclists at the 2008 Summer Olympics
Olympic cyclists of Poland
Doping cases in cycling
Sportspeople from Masovian Voivodeship
Polish sportspeople in doping cases
21st-century Polish people